Matthew Anthony Herbert (9 August 1920 – 6 March 2014) was an Irish Fianna Fáil politician and hurler, who played as a full-forward for the Limerick senior team.

Biography
Born in Castleconnell, County Limerick, Herbert first played competitive hurling while at school in Limerick CBS. He arrived on the inter-county scene at the age of seventeen when he first linked up with the Limerick minor team. He made his senior debut during the 1939 Oireachtas Cup. Herbert went on to play a key role for Limerick for a brief period, before later joining the Dublin senior team, and won one All-Ireland medal, two Leinster medals and one Munster medal. He was an All-Ireland runner-up on two occasions.

As a member of the Leinster inter-provincial team at various times throughout his career, Herbert ended his career without a Railway Cup medal. At club level he won five hurling championship and four football championship with Ahane, before later winning five hurling championship medals with Faughs.

Herbert's retirement came following the conclusion of the 1954 championship.

Whilst still a player, Herbert became involved in team management and coaching. He trained and coached the Dublin minor hurling team to Leinster success in 1952.

His uncle, Paddy Kenneally, was an All-Ireland medallist with Kerry in Gaelic football. Herbert's brothers, Seán and Michael, and his nephew, Turlough all played with Limerick.

Herbert was elected to Seanad Éireann in 1977 by the Labour Panel. He lost his seat at the 1981 election but was re-elected to the 16th Seanad at the 1982 election. He lost his seat again at the 1983 election.

At the time of his death Herbert was Limerick's oldest All-Ireland medallist, while he was also the last surviving member of the 1940 All-Ireland-winning team.

Honours

Player
Limerick CBS
Dean Ryan Cup (2): 1937, 1938 (c)

Ahane
Limerick Senior Hurling Championship (5):  1936, 1937, 1938, 1939, 1942
Limerick Senior Football Championship (4):  1936, 1937, 1938, 1939

Faughs
Dublin Senior Hurling Championship (5):  1944, 1945, 1946, 1950, 1952

Limerick
All-Ireland Senior Hurling Championship (1): 1940
Munster Senior Hurling Championship (1): 1940
Oireachtas Cup (1):  1939

Dublin
Leinster Senior Hurling Championship (2): 1948, 1952
Oireachtas Cup (1):  1948

Coach
Dublin
Leinster Minor Hurling Championship (1): 1952

See also
Families in the Oireachtas

References

1920 births
2014 deaths
Fianna Fáil senators
Ahane hurlers
Faughs hurlers
Limerick inter-county hurlers
Dublin inter-county hurlers
Munster inter-provincial hurlers
Leinster inter-provincial hurlers
Members of the 14th Seanad
Members of the 16th Seanad
Politicians from County Limerick
All-Ireland Senior Hurling Championship winners